Titus Fulvius Iunius Quietus (died 261) was a Roman usurper.

Quietus (Latin for "calm" or "at rest") may also refer to:

People:
 Lusius Quietus, Roman general and governor
 Titus Avidius Quietus, Roman politician

In popular culture:
 Quietus, a 1940 short sci-fi story by Ross Rocklynne
 Quietus, a 1979 short story by Orson Scott Card
 "Quietus", the name of a mass-drowning ceremony in the 1992 novel The Children of Men
 "Quietus", the name of a suicide kit in the 2006 film adaptation, Children of Men
 Quietus, a spell used in the Harry Potter series of books
 Quietus (album), a 2001 album by the doom metal band Evoken
 Quietus (Silent Reverie), a song from the 2005 album Consign to Oblivion by Epica
 "Quietus", a vampiric discipline from the Assamite clan in the role-playing game Vampire: the Masquerade.
 "Quietus", a branch of the organization Contact in Iain M. Bank's fictional universe
 "Quietus", is a weapon from Hexen: Beyond Heretic, a 1995 dark fantasy video game by id Software and Raven Software. It resembles a longsword with a fiery green aura, and is Baratus the Fighter's final weapon that can be retrieved in the game. The Quietus, like the fourth weapons for the other classes, is in pieces.
 "Quietus", the lighthouse planet, is a setting in the comic series Saga (comics).
Other:
 The Quietus, a British online music and pop culture magazine
 Lactarius quietus, a species of mushroom
Dying.